Nicholas Joseph Damore (July 10, 1916 – April 16, 1969) was a Canadian professional ice hockey goaltender who played in one National Hockey League game for the Boston Bruins during the 1941–42 season. The rest of his career, which lasted from 1934 to 1952, was mainly spent with the Hershey Bears in the Eastern Amateur Hockey League and American Hockey League.

Playing career
On January 25, 1942, Damore replaced regular goalie Frank Brimsek, who was unable to play due a broken nose. The Bruins defeated the Montreal Canadiens 7-3. Brimsek returned for the following game. He died in 1969. He is the brother of Hank D'Amore

Career statistics

Regular season and playoffs

See also
List of players who played only one game in the NHL

References

External links

1916 births
1969 deaths
Baltimore Orioles (ice hockey) players
Boston Bruins players
Canadian expatriate ice hockey players in the United States
Canadian ice hockey goaltenders
Hershey Bears players
Ice hockey people from Ontario
Johnstown Jets players
Philadelphia Rockets players
Providence Reds players
Sportspeople from Niagara Falls, Ontario
Washington Lions players